Trine Schmidt Hansen (born 3 June 1988) is a Danish professional racing cyclist, who currently rides for UCI Women's Continental Team

Major results 

2003
 National Track Championships
3rd Points race
3rd Sprint

2004
 1st  Scratch, National Track Championships

2005
 2nd Individual pursuit, National Track Championships

2006
 1st  Team time trial, National Road Championships (with Mie Lacota and Anette Berg)
 National Track Championships
2nd, Individual pursuit
3rd, Scratch
3rd, Sprint

2007
 1st  Time trial, National Road Championships
 National Track Championships
1st  Individual pursuit
1st  Scratch
3rd Sprint
 1st Overall VDO Lady Cup
 1st Stage 4 Gracia–Orlová
 1st CH-Transport Løbet/CK Fix
 1st Sjællandsmesterskab
 1st Sorø
 1st Vejen

2008
 2nd Points race, UCI Track World Championships
 2nd Points race, 2007–08 UCI Track Cycling World Cup Classics, Copenhagen
 
2009
National Track Championships
1st  Individual pursuit
2nd Scratch
1st Stage 5 Gran Caracol de Pista
National Road Championships
2nd Time trial
2nd Road race
2nd Chrono des Nations
5th Time trial, UEC European Under-23 Road Championships

2010 
2nd Time trial, National Road Championships

2011 
National Road Championships
3rd Time trial
3rd Road race

2016
National Track Championships
2nd Scratch
2nd Points race
2nd Individual pursuit
2nd Omnium
2nd Time trial, National Road Championships
3rd Individual pursuit, Milton International Challenge
2017
UEC European Championships
1st  Points race 
1st  Scratch
National Track Championships
1st  Scratch
1st  Individual pursuit
Öschelbronn
1st Scratch
2nd Madison (with Amalie Winther Olsen)
1st Madison, Oberhausen (with Amalie Winther Olsen)
Dublin International 
1st Scratch
2nd Omnium
2nd Points race
Prilba Moravy 
2nd Scratch
3rd Omnium
2nd Madison, GP Zürich – Oerlikon (with Amalie Winther Olsen)
Zesdaagse Vlaanderen-Gent
2nd Omnium
2nd Points race

References

External links 

Danish female cyclists
Danish track cyclists
1988 births
Living people
Cyclists at the 2008 Summer Olympics
Olympic cyclists of Denmark
Cyclists from Copenhagen
21st-century Danish women